Typhlogastrura is a genus of springtails in the family Hypogastruridae. There are about 19 described species in Typhlogastrura.

Species
These 19 species belong to the genus Typhlogastrura:

 Typhlogastrura alabamensis Thibaud, 1975 i c g
 Typhlogastrura asymmetrica Christiansen & Wang, 2006 i c g
 Typhlogastrura atlantea (Gisin, 1951) i c g
 Typhlogastrura breuili Thibaud, 1967 i c g
 Typhlogastrura christianseni Thibaud, 1975 i c g
 Typhlogastrura elsarzolae Palacios-Vargas & Thibaud, 1997 i c g
 Typhlogastrura fousheensis Christiansen & Wang, 2006 i c g
 Typhlogastrura helleri Christiansen & Wang, 2006 i c g
 Typhlogastrura korenevskyi Babenko, 1987 i c g
 Typhlogastrura mendizabali (Bonet, 1930) i c g
 Typhlogastrura morozovi Babenko, 1987 i c g
 Typhlogastrura preobrazhenskyi Babenko, 1987 i c g
 Typhlogastrura shtanchevae Abdurakhmanov & Babenko, 1991 i c g
 Typhlogastrura steinmanni Christiansen & Wang, 2006 i c g
 Typhlogastrura thibaudi Babenko in Babenko, Chernova, Potapov & Stebaeva, 1994 i c g
 Typhlogastrura topali (Loksa & Bogojevic, 1967) i c g
 Typhlogastrura unica Christiansen & Wang, 2006 i c g
 Typhlogastrura valentini Thibaud, 1966 i c g
 Typhlogastrura veracruzana Palacios-Vargas & Thibaud, 1985 i c g

Data sources: i = ITIS, c = Catalogue of Life, g = GBIF, b = Bugguide.net

References

Further reading

 
 
 

Collembola
Springtail genera